Myopopone is a genus of ants in the subfamily Amblyoponinae. The genus contains two species, one extant and one fossil. The type species Myopopone castanea is known from the Oriental and Indo-Australian regions, and China. The fossil species, Myopopone sinensis, is known from the Early Miocene.

Species
 Myopopone castanea (Smith, 1860)
 †Myopopone sinensis Zhang, 1989

References

External links

Amblyoponinae
Ant genera